is a Japanese politician of the Liberal Democratic Party, a member of the House of Councillors in the Diet (national legislature).

A native of Shiida, Fukuoka and graduate of Meiji University, he was elected for the first time in 2001.

References

External links 
 Official website in Japanese.

Members of the House of Councillors (Japan)
1959 births
Living people
Liberal Democratic Party (Japan) politicians
Meiji University alumni